St. James Township or Saint James Township may refer to several places in the United States:

 St. James Township, Charlevoix County, Michigan
 St. James Township, Watonwan County, Minnesota
 St. James Township, in Mississippi County, Missouri
 St. James Township, in Phelps County, Missouri

See also
 James Township (disambiguation)
 St. James (disambiguation)

Township name disambiguation pages